Achievement Hunter is an American video gaming division of Rooster Teeth Productions. Founded by Geoff Ramsey and Jack Pattillo on July 6, 2008, the website is largely based on the achievement mechanic in video games. Since its founding, Achievement Hunter has grown to become a core component of Rooster Teeth, hosting a wide variety of videos related to video games. Alongside recurring guests and part-time members, Achievement Hunter videos are currently hosted by several full-time employees: Jack Pattillo, Gavin Free, Michael Jones, Lindsay Jones, Trevor Collins, Alfredo Diaz, Ky Cooke, BlackKrystel, and Joe Lee.

History and development

2008–2010: Inception 
In 2008, Geoff Ramsey's interest in gaming achievements resulted in the realization that no community-based website related to achievements existed. Since Ramsey and Burnie Burns, then Rooster Teeth CEO, were both "huge achievement fans" and dueling each other to get the most achievements in their spare time, Ramsey had an idea to begin developing a website where gamers and fans could look up information on how to get specific achievements. Ramsey approached Burns about creating a website based on achievements; Burns agreed, and Ramsey created Achievement Hunter, which shares a similar design to the main Rooster Teeth website. Ramsey later elaborated, saying he had grown tired of making Red vs. Blue and enjoyed working on this new, creative outlet in his spare time. Alongside employee Jack Pattillo, Ramsey regularly released achievement guides and Easter egg videos, often receiving assistance from select volunteers from the Rooster Teeth community. David Dreger also assisted in the founding of the site.

2011–2012: Employment growth 
In 2011, Achievement Hunter hired Ryan Haywood as an editor and manager; Haywood later began being featured in videos as a host in March 2012, becoming one of the main crew members. Four new shows were introduced to Achievement Hunter in 2011. One of them, Rage Quit, led to the official hiring of Michael Jones as a full-time staff member in August 2011.

In December 2011, Achievement Hunter also began creating Let's Play videos. The success of the videos resulted in a weekly sub-series in 2012, in which the main hosts play Minecraft. Weekly Let's Play videos focusing on Grand Theft Auto games are also released. Let's Play Grand Theft Auto is typically released on Mondays and Let's Play Minecraft on Fridays.

Achievement Hunter hired Gavin Free in 2012, after he had assisted with the company for many years. In March 2012, Achievement Hunter debuted Game Night, in which Ramsey and Caleb Denecour play games with community members; the series switched to a live stream format in 2014. Community member Ray Narvaez, Jr. was hired in April 2012, having worked as a contract host for multiple years. Later, in September 2012, contract editor Franco Scarcello created Five Facts, which was generally hosted by Pattillo and Ramsey and focused on little-known facts about various video games; it was not renewed for a sixth season in May 2016.

2013–2015: Popularization and the Let's Play Network 
In early 2013, Achievement Hunter introduced a competition series titled VS, in which the employees challenge each other to compete in games. In April 2013, Achievement Hunter launched their own channel on YouTube, which hosts a variety of their videos. Later in 2013, the company retired Achievement HORSE, replacing it with Achievement HUNT, in which a variety of employees challenge each other until the word "HUNT" has been spelled.

In October 2013, Pattillo hosted a 24-hour live stream for Extra Life, a charity benefiting hospitalized children. With appearances from other Achievement Hunter members and various Rooster Teeth employees, the live stream raised $340,000. This charity live stream has become an annual event, with 2014's Extra Life live stream raising over $442,000 for Children's Miracle Network. At RTX in July 2014, community members Matt Bragg and Jeremy Dooley were hired as editors and secondary hosts at Achievement Hunter.

On February 5, 2015, Achievement Hunter officially founded the Let's Play Network YouTube channel. The channel acted as a platform for multiple Rooster Teeth owned and affiliated groups and divisions to upload gameplays. Some of these groups included the likes of Funhaus, ScrewAttack, Cow Chop, Kinda Funny, and Sugar Pine 7. Although, a majority of the channel's videos still consisted of Achievement Hunter's content.

In early 2015, Achievement Hunter hosted the first Let's Play Live at the Moody Theater in Austin, Texas. In April 2015, Narvaez departed from the company as a full-time employee to focus on Twitch live-streaming, although he continued to voice his character for the company's X-Ray and Vav animated series until its eventual cancellation. In mid-2015, Achievement Hunter launched a new YouTube channel, named after themselves, where they upload series of videos that were previously uploaded to the Rooster Teeth channel. Additionally, they moved out of Rooster Teeth's Stage 5, Austin Studios office into their own office nearby.

Dooley was promoted to a main host in October 2015, during an episode of Let's Play Minecraft. A weekly podcast titled Off Topic was announced in early October, hosted by Michael Jones. Four test episodes aired live and were only available to "First Members" on their website. The first official episode aired to the public after the initial tests. Jones serves as the main host of the show and makes the most frequent appearances alongside other Achievement Hunter employees and special guests, including Patricia Sommerset, Arin Hanson, Chef Mike Haracz and Samm Levine. He also hosts the after show Last Call available for First Members only.

Starting in 2015, Achievement Hunter occasionally featured celebrities as guest collaborators in some of their Let's Play videos, including Watsky, Rahul Kohli from iZombie, Dan Campbell from The Wonder Years, Laura Bailey and Travis Willingham, Dante Basco, James Buckley, Lannan Eacott, Kumail Nanjiani, and pop punk band Neck Deep.

2016–2019: Branching out from video games 
In January 2016, Lindsay Jones became the head of Achievement Hunter, succeeding Ramsey. In April 2016, Achievement Hunter launched two new shows. A new series called VR the Champions premiered on YouTube and featured Haywood, Dooley, and other members testing out new gameplay in virtual reality. In addition, a First Member only show known as Theater Mode was created, and includes hosts like Jones, Ramsey, and Pattillo, as well as others, watching horrible movies and commenting on them. Later in 2016, Achievement Hunter introduced RouLet's Play, where hosts play a game at random, Heroes and Halfwits, a sort of dungeons and dragons gameplay with Haywood, Jones, Ramsey, Griffon Ramsey, and Gus Sorola, and Schooled in which Ramsey and his daughter Millie teach kids to play video games in hopes of defeating the main Achievement Hunter members.

In February 2017, Ramsey announced his sabbatical from the company. At this time, it was also announced that Trevor Collins was the new head of Achievement Hunter, succeeding Jones. Later on, two months into his break, Ramsey and Millie premiered the second season of Schooled. This time around the kids were being trained by the main members to battle each other. In April, Achievement Hunter went on tour on the east coast to perform Let's Play Live! with Funhaus in New Jersey, Maryland, and Florida.

As part of Rooster Teeth's Pilot Month, a test episode of a new ghost hunting show called Achievement Haunter premiered on May 17, 2018. The episode was considered a success and the series was green-lit for an eight episode first season, which aired on October 31, 2018.

Hardcore Tabletop, a show that takes board games and gives them real world twists, premiered on August 21, 2018. The first season had Achievement Hunter personalities play Monopoly with real money, with the potential to earn up to $20,580. The second season, titled Hardcore Tabletop: World Series, aired on April 10, 2019, and returned to Monopoly with Diaz as the winner of the previous season and competitors from the Let's Play family including actor Dante Basco.

2020–present 
On June 10, 2020, Achievement Hunter premiered their new show titled Hardcore Minigolf, where employees and friends of the company compete in a tournament style game of mini-golf.

On October 6, 2020, Haywood announced his departure from the company following a leak of explicit photographs and amid accusations of grooming fans, including some underage. On October 7, Rooster Teeth issued a statement saying they had "parted ways" for breach of the company's code of conduct. In a livestream held after a brief hiatus from the fallout, Pattillo and Michael Jones denounced Haywood, announcing that several videos featuring him would be removed from Rooster Teeth's library and that he would never be allowed back at the division.

In May 2021, three featured contract missions created by members of Achievement Hunter were added to Hitman 3.

Let's Play Live 

Let's Play Live! is an on-stage event produced by Rooster Teeth in which the Achievement Hunter members play video games and perform comedy sketches in front of a live audience. Their first event was held on February 20, 2015, at the Moody Theater in Austin, Texas. 

Three more Let's Play Live! events were held in 2016, with the first at the Dolby Theatre in Hollywood, California on June 17, the second at the Chicago Theatre in Chicago, Illinois on August 19, and the third at the Hammerstein Ballroom in New York City, New York on October 8. These events also featured appearances by other members of the Let's Play family; Funhaus, ScrewAttack, Kinda Funny, Cow Chop and The Creatures.

In 2017, four Let's Play Live! shows were announced as the East Coast Tour. The tour was held from April 24 to April 30, with them going to the New Jersey Performing Arts Center in Newark, New Jersey, the Hippodrome Theatre in Baltimore, Maryland, Hard Rock Live in Orlando, Florida and the Straz Center for the Performing Arts in Tampa, Florida.

Charity 
With members of Rooster Teeth that work outside of Achievement Hunter, the group works with different charities to raise money through livestreams and other methods. This is in part to Jack Pattillo being a part of Achievement Hunter and Rooster Teeth's Charity Director, causing him to be a large part of organizing events, promoting them on the Achievement Hunter page, and asking fans and friends to be a part of the event. He summed up the point in a statement; "When Rooster Teeth calls on its fans to support a cause, we can count on them to help us make a huge impact."

Through cooperation between Make-A-Wish and the Achievement Hunter parent company Rooster Teeth, the members of Achievement Hunter met teenager Erik Battany during RTX in August 2015. Battany and his family had been gifted VIP passes to RTX 2015, meeting them at a VIP party and the next day played with members for an Assassins Creed: Syndicate mission. On May 23, 2014, there was another visitor through Make-A-Wish, a boy named Jacob.

List of shows

Cast 
 Jack Pattillo 
 Gavin Free 
 Michael Jones 
 Lindsay Jones 
 Trevor Collins 
 Alfredo Diaz 
 Kylah "Ky" Cooke 
 BlackKrystel 
 Joe "LoeJeez" Lee

Recurring 
 Geoff Ramsey 
 Jeremy Dooley 
 Matt Bragg

Former cast 
 Ray Narvaez, Jr. 
 Caleb Denecour 
 Kdin Jenzen 
 Mica Burton 
 Ryan Haywood 
 Fiona Nova

Timeline of cast members

References

External links 

 

2008 establishments in Texas
American gaming websites
American Internet groups
Internet properties established in 2008
Let's Players
Rooster Teeth channels
Video game websites